The University of Nusa Cendana is a public university in Kupang, East Nusa Tenggara, Indonesia. It was established on September 1, 1962. Its rector is Maxs Sanam.

In 2021, the United States Agency for International Development (USAID) and the Ministry of Education, Culture, Research, and Technology (META) launched an initiative to improve digital literacy among Indonesian university students. The five-year initiative focused on five universities in Indonesia, including the University of Nusa Cendana. Lecturers were provided with training and resources to teach digital literacy skills to students.

Schools
The university has eight faculties:
 School of Education and Teacher Training
 School of Social and Political Sciences
 School of Animal Science
 School of Law
 School of Agriculture
 School of Community Health
 School of Science and Engineering
 School of Medicine

Undana Rectors
Rectors of Undana NTT:

 Mohamad Salim (1962-1967),
 Letkol Elias Tari, better known as El Tari (1967-1968)
 Soetan Mohamad Sjah (1968-1976),
 Urias Bait (1976-1977),
 Frans E. Likadja (1978-1987),
 Mozes R.Toelihere (1988-1996),
 August Benu (1996-2005),
 Frans Umbu Datta (2005-2013)
 Fredrik Lukas Benu (2013-2021)
 Maxs U. E. Sanam. (2021-2025)

References

External links
 Official website

Kupang
Universities in East Nusa Tenggara
Indonesian state universities
Educational institutions established in 1962
1962 establishments in Indonesia